This article lists the main weightlifting events and their results for 2014.

2014 Summer Youth Olympics
 August 17 – 23: 2014 Summer Youth Olympics
However,  won the overall medal tally.

World & Grand Prix weightlifting championships
 June 20 – 28: 2014 Junior World Weightlifting Championships in  Kazan
 Host nation, won both the gold and overall medal tallies, for men and women overall results.
 September 6 – ?: 2014 IWF Grand Prix - President's Cup in  Noyabrsk
 Men's 94 kg winner:  Egor Klimonov
 Men's 105 kg winner:  Artūrs Plēsnieks
 Men's +105 kg winner:  Antoniy Savchuk
 Women's 75 kg winner:  XIE Hongli
 Women's +75 kg winner:  Shaimaa Khalaf
 November 8 – 16: 2014 World Weightlifting Championships in  Almaty
  and  won 4 gold medals each in the Big category. China won the overall medal tally in the same category.
  won the gold medal tally in the Big and Small category. China won the overall medal tally in the same category.
  won the team rankings for the men and women events.
 December 5 – ?: 2014 FISU World University Weightlifting Championships in  Chiang Mai
  won both the gold and overall medal tallies.

Continental and regional weightlifting championships
 March 4 – ?: 2014 Asian Junior Weightlifting Championships in  Bangsaen
  won the gold medal tally.  won the overall medal tally.
 March 31 – ?: 2014 Pan American Junior Weightlifting Championships in  Reno
  won the gold medal tally.  won the overall medal tally.
 April 5 – 12: 2014 European Weightlifting Championships in  Tel Aviv
  won both the gold and overall medal tallies, in both "Big" and "Small" categories.
 April 15 – ?: 2014 African Junior & Youth Weightlifting Championships in  Tunis
 Junior:  won both the gold and overall medal tallies.
 Youth:  won both the gold and overall medal tallies.
 April 28 – ?: 2014 European Youth Weightlifting Championships in  Ciechanów
  won the gold medal tally. Russia, &  won 7 overall medals each.
 May 7 – ?: 2014 Pan American & South American Youth Weightlifting Championships in  Lima
 Pan American:  won the gold medal tally.  won the overall medal tally.
 South American:  won the gold medal tally. Ecuador &  won 13 overall medals each.
 May 25 – ?: 2014 Oceanian Senior, Junior & Youth Weightlifting Championships in / Le Mont-Dore
 Senior:  and  won 3 gold medals each.  won the overall medal tally.
 Junior:  won the gold medal tally.  won the overall medal tally.
 Youth:  &  won 4 gold medals each. Australia won the overall medal tally.
 May 25 – ?: 2014 South Pacific Senior, Junior, & Youth Weightlifting Championships in / Le Mont-Dore
 Senior:  won the gold medal tally.  won the overall medal tally.
 Junior:  and  won 3 gold medals each. Papua New Guinea won the overall medal tally.
 Youth:  won the gold medal tally.  won the overall medal tally.
 May 26 – June 2: 2014 Pan American Weightlifting Championships in  Santo Domingo
 Men:  won the gold medal tally, in the "Small" category.  won the overall medal tally, in the "Small" category. Colombia and Cuba won 3 gold medals each, in the "Big" category. Cuba won the overall medal tally, in the "Big" category.
 Women:  won both the gold and overall medal tallies, in the "Small" category. Colombia won the gold medal tally, in the "Big" category. Colombia, and  won the overall medal tally, in the "Big" category, with 4 medals each.
 November 18 – ?: 2014 Afro-Asian Weightlifting Championships in  Tashkent
  won both the gold and overall medal tallies.
 November 21 – ?: 2014 European Junior Weightlifting Championships in  Limassol
  won both the gold and overall medal tallies.

References

External links
 International Weightlifting Federation Website

 
Weightlifting by year
2014 in sports